Sarah Ledger (born 21 September 1989) is a British athlete who plays for the Great Britain women's national ice hockey team as defenseman.

References

1989 births
British women's ice hockey defencemen
Living people
Place of birth missing (living people)